Joyce Chi-Hui Liu  is Professor of Critical Theory, Cultural Studies and Comparative Literature at National Chiao Tung University, Taiwan. Liu is the Chair of the Institute of Social Research and Cultural Studies that she founded in 2002. She is also the director of the International Center for Cultural Studies of the University System of Taiwan.

Education 
Liu obtained a bachelor's degree in English literature in 1978 from Fu Jen Catholic University.
She moved to the University of Illinois at Urbana–Champaign for graduate study in comparative literature, earning a master's degree in 1980 and a Ph.D. in 1984.

Career 
Liu's works concentrate on the question of aesthetics, ethics, and politics, ranging from Marx, Freud and Lacan, to contemporary critical theories as well as Chinese political thoughts. She has been a critic of East-Asian modernity and internal coloniality, particularly through re-reading the Chinese intellectual history of the twentieth century and the contemporary political-economy in inter-Asian societies.  She served as the chief editor of the only journal of cultural studies in Taiwan, Router: A Journal of Cultural Studies, from 2012–2107. She is currently the Chair of the Institute of Social Research and Cultural Studies that she founded in 2002. She is also the director of the International Center for Cultural Studies of the University System of Taiwan.

Academic Positions 
After Liu's graduation, she became Associate Professor in English Department of Fu Jen Catholic University between 1984 and 1994. In 1988, she became the chair of the department. In 1994, she became the director of Graduate Institute of Comparative Literature in Fu Jen Catholic University. Since 1994, she became a professor of Graduate Institute of Comparative Literature. She once served as the president of Cultural Studies Association in Taiwan.

In 2001, Liu transferred to Department of Foreign Languages and Literatures in National Chiao Tung University and served as a professor. In 2002, she founded Institute of Social Research and Cultural Studies in National Chiao Tung University and became the director and professor of it until 2004. She's also the director of Center for Emergent Cultural Studies, National Chiao Tung University between 2001 and 2006. She restarted as the director of Institute of Social Research and Cultural Studies twice between 2008 and 2011 and between 2013 and 2019. Between 2011 and 2017, Liu was chief editor of Wenhua Yanjiu (Router: A Journal of Cultural Studies).

Liu is now a Chair Professor in Institute of Social Research and Cultural Studies (SRCS-NCTU), National Chiao Tung University since 2019. She's also the director of International Institute for Cultural Studies (ICCS-NCTU & UST), National Chiao Tung University & University System of Taiwan since 2012. Besides, she's the director of International Graduate Institute for Inter-Asia Cultural Studies, University System of Taiwan since 2013.

Publications
Among her publications, the representative works are the three co-edited volumes: East-Asian Marxisms and their Trajectories (Routledge 2017), European-East Asian Borders in Translation (Routledge 2014), Biopolitics, Ethics and Subjectivation (Paris: L'Harmattan, 2011); and the influential trilogy that she authored: The Topology of Psyche: The Post-1895 Reconfiguration of Ethics (2011), The Perverted Heart: The Psychic Forms of Modernity (2004), as well as Orphan, Goddess, and the Writing of the Negative: The Performance of Our Symptoms (2000).

Books
 One Divides into Two: Philosophical Archaeology of Modern Chinese Political Thought. Taipei: Lianjing Publisher, 2020. 462 ps.
 The Topology of Psyche: The Post-1895 Reconstruction of Ethics. Taipei: Flaneur, 2011. 446 ps. (NSC Publication Award 2011) 
 The Perverted Heart: The Psychic Forms of Modernity. Taipei: Ryefield Publisher, 2004. 368ps. (NICT Publication Award 2004) 
 Literature and Film: Image, Reality and Cultural Criticism. Taipei. 161 ps. (Publication sponsored by NSC) 
 Orphan, Goddess, and the Writing of the Negative: The Performance of Our Symptoms. Taipei: Lixu Publisher, 2000. 470ps.
 Eight Essays on Literature and the Other Arts: Intertextuality, Counterpoint and Cultural Interpretation.  Taipei: San Ming Books Publisher. 193ps. (with review system)

Co-edited volumes 
 Inter-Asia Cultural Studies. Special Issue: Artistic mediation of Decolonized Body. Eds. Joyce C.H. Liu & Naoki Sakai. Vol. 19, Issue 4 (Dec. 2018).
 The Position of Philosophy and Politics: Special Issue on Alain Badiou. Chung Wai Literary Quarterly. Vol. 47, No. 3. September 2018.
 East-Asian Marxisms and their Trajectories. Eds. Joyce C.H. Liu & Viren Mirthy. London: Routledge, 2017.
 European-East Asian Borders in Translation. Eds. Joyce C. H. Liu and Nick Vaughan-Williams. London: Routledge, 2013. Forthcoming.
 Biopolitics, Ethics and Subjectivation. Eds. Joyce C.H. Liu & Alain Brossai, Yuan-Horng Chu, Rada Ivekovic. Paris: L'Harmattan, 2011.
 Special Issue: Koyasu Nobukuni Joyce C.H. Liu. Ed. Router: A Journal of Cultural Studies. 2008.
 Visual Culture and Critical Theory I: Empire, Asia and the Question of Subject Ed. Joyce Chi-Hui Liu. Taipei: Ryefield Publisher, 2006.
 Visual Culture and Critical Theory II: Everyday Life and Popular Culture Ed. Joyce Chi-Hui Liu. Taipei: Ryefield Publisher, 2006.
 Visual Theories and Cultural Studies. Ed. Joyce Chi-Hui Liu. Taipei: Chung Wai Publisher, 2002.
 The Realms of the Other: Cultural Identities and Politics of Representation. Ed. Joyce Chi-Hui Liu. Taipei: Ryefield Publisher, 2002.
 China as Sign, Taiwan as Icon. Ed. Joyce Chi-hui Liu. Taipei: Chungwai Wenxue, 2000.
 Writing Taiwan. Eds. Chou Yingxung & Liu Chi-Hui Joyce. Taipei: Ryefield Publisher, 2000.
 Inter-Frames: Word-Image-Music and the Semiotic Boundaries. Ed. Joyce Chi-Hui Liu. Taipei: Lixu Publisher. 1999.

Scholarly Translations into Chinese
 La Mésentente. Politique et philosophie. by Jacque Rancière. co-translated with Shufen Lin, Kelun Chen, Xiping Xue. Taipei: Maitian Publisher. 2011.
 An Introductory Dictionary of Lacanian Psychoanalysis by Dylan Evans. co-translated with Chaoyang Liao, Zonghui Huang, Zhuojun Gong. Taipei: Juliu Publisher. 2009.
 Milky Way. by Kaja Silverman. chungwai wenxue. 30.12 (2002.5): 25–53.

References

External links
 In Chinese

 

Living people
Academic staff of the National Chiao Tung University
Year of birth missing (living people)
Fu Jen Catholic University alumni
University of Illinois Urbana-Champaign alumni
Taiwanese women academics
20th-century Taiwanese women writers
21st-century Taiwanese women writers